KAGY (1510 AM, "The Swamp Pop Network") is a radio station broadcasting a Swamp Pop format based in southeast Louisiana. Licensed to Port Sulphur, Louisiana, United States, the station is currently owned by Spotlight Broadcasting of New Orleans, LLC. The station originates in Port Sulphur and covers the New Orleans metro. With the location being on the water, the signal travels across the water and covers the coastal areas of Biloxi, Gulfport and Mobile, Alabama.

This FCC assigned call sign had been previously assigned to the college radio station at South Dakota State University, in Brookings, South Dakota.  Originally, it had a standard AM transmitter that covered the local area, but due to some incidents, the station was reduced to operate through common-carrier transmitters in the dormitories, which used the AC power mains in the buildings for distribution.  The "AGY" part of the call-sign was due to the school being an agriculturally based, land-grant college, thus, KAGY.

KAGY has been the very popular Swamp Pop format since 2002.

On March 9, 2017, KAGY was granted a Federal Communications Commission construction permit to move to a new transmitter site, increase day power to 3,000 watts and add critical hours operation with 720 watts.

References

External links

Radio stations in Louisiana
Radio stations established in 1966
Daytime-only radio stations in Louisiana
1966 establishments in Louisiana